Qarah Tappeh or Qareh Tappeh or Qarahtapeh or Qareh Tapeh, also rendered as Qara Tepe or Qara Tappeh, may refer to:

Afghanistan
Qarah Tappeh, Afghanistan

Iran

Ardabil Province
Qareh Tappeh, Ardabil, Iran
Qarah Tappeh, Namin, Ardabil Province, Iran
Qarah Tappeh, Nir, Ardabil Province, Iran

East Azerbaijan Province
Qareh Tappeh, Marand, East Azerbaijan Province, Iran
Qarah Tappeh, Meyaneh, East Azerbaijan Province, Iran
Qareh Tappeh, Shabestar, East Azerbaijan Province, Iran
Qareh Tappeh, Tabriz, East Azerbaijan Province, Iran
Qareh Tappeh, Ozomdel-e Jonubi, Varzaqan County, East Azerbaijan Province, Iran
Qareh Tappeh, Sina, Varzaqan County, East Azerbaijan Province, Iran

Golestan Province
Qarah Tappeh, Aqqala, Golestan Province, Iran
Qarah Tappeh, Torkaman, Golestan Province, Iran

Isfahan Province
Qareh Tappeh, Isfahan, a village in Tiran and Karvan County

Kerman Province
Qarah Tappeh, Kerman
Qarah Tappeh-ye Ashayiri-ye Do, Kerman Province

Kermanshah Province
Qarah Tappeh, Kermanshah
Qarah Tappeh, Sonqor, Kermanshah Province

Markazi Province
Qarah Tappeh, Khondab, Markazi Province, Iran
Qarah Tappeh, Shazand, Markazi Province, Iran

Mazandaran Province
Qarah Tappeh, Mazandaran, a village in Behshahr County

Tehran Province
Qarah Tappeh, Tehran, Iran

West Azerbaijan Province
Qarah Tappeh, Chaypareh, West Azerbaijan Province, Iran
Qarah Tappeh, Khoy, West Azerbaijan Province, Iran
Qarah Tappeh, Maku, West Azerbaijan Province, Iran
Qareh Tappeh, Miandoab, West Azerbaijan Province, Iran
Qarah Tappeh, Shahin Dezh, West Azerbaijan Province, Iran
Qarah Tappeh Railway Station, West Azerbaijan Province, Iran

Zanjan Province
Qarah Tappeh, Abhar, Zanjan Province
Qarah Tappeh, Zanjan, Zanjan Province
Qarah Tappeh, Qareh Poshtelu, Zanjan County, Zanjan Province
Qarah Tappeh-ye Sabalan, Iran

Iraq
Qara Tapa, Iraq, Diyala Governorate

See also
Karatepe (disambiguation)